The enzyme GDP-mannose 4,6-dehydratase catalyzes the chemical reaction

GDP-mannose  GDP-4-dehydro-6-deoxy-D-mannose + H2O

This enzyme belongs to the family of lyases, specifically the hydro-lyases, which cleave carbon-oxygen bonds.  The systematic name of this enzyme class is GDP-mannose 4,6-hydro-lyase (GDP-4-dehydro-6-deoxy-D-mannose-forming). Other names in common use include guanosine 5'-diphosphate-D-mannose oxidoreductase, guanosine diphosphomannose oxidoreductase, guanosine diphosphomannose 4,6-dehydratase, GDP-D-mannose dehydratase, GDP-D-mannose 4,6-dehydratase, Gmd, and GDP-mannose 4,6-hydro-lyase.  This enzyme participates in fructose and mannose metabolism.  It employs one cofactor, NAD+.

GDP-Mannose 4, 6-Dehydratase Reaction 

The enzyme GDP-Mannose 4, 6-Dehydratase is in the lyase family of enzymes, specifically the hydro-lyases. Other names in use include guanosine 5'-diphosphate-D-mannose oxidoreductase, guanosine diphosphomannose oxidoreductase, guanosine diphosphomannose 4,6-dehydratase, GDP-D-mannose dehydratase, GDP-D-mannose 4,6-dehydratase, GMD, and GDP-mannose 4,6-hydro-lyase.  The enzyme is a part of the GDP-Fucose de novo synthesis pathway and catalyzes the first step in the process that gives us GDP-Fucose which is essential for the transfer of Fucose sugars. Its primary structure contains 372 amino acids.  This is an essential enzyme in that fucose plays a major role in cell immunity and signaling. Currently GDP-Mannose 4, 6-Dehydratase is not the target of any available drugs, however it is being experimentally targeted with the drug Guanosine-5'-Diphosphate. The chemical reaction of GDP-Mannose 4, 6-Dehydratase is as shown:

GDP-mannose ↔ GDP-4-dehydro-6-deoxy-D-mannose + H2O

Factors In The Reaction 
The enzymes substrate, what the enzyme is acting on, is the GDP-Mannose substance. No other substrates are use this enzyme for reactions.

When the enzyme undergoes its catalyzing process the main product is gets is when it converts GDP-mannose to GDP-4-dehydro-6-deoxy-D-mannose which is then subsequently converted to GDP-Fucose which is crucial for the body to process correctly. It acts as an intermediate step between GDP-Mannose and GDP-Fucose.

In the reaction that the enzyme uses it requires only one cofactor, a compound required for activation, which is NADP(+) however it is uncertain if this compound truly activates the enzyme.

GDP-Fucose is an allosteric inhibitor of the enzyme.

GDP-Fucose Biosynthesis Pathway 
The enzyme GDP-Mannose 4, 6-Dehydratase is only present in one pathway that we know of. This pathway is the GDP-mannose-dependent de novo pathway which provides most of the bodies GDP-Fucose whereas minor amounts come from fucose salvaging in the body.

In the pathway the enzyme is in an intermediate step that converts GDP-Mannose to GDP-4-dehydro-6-deoxy-D-mannose which is then converted into GDP-Fucose which is absolutely crucial to the body. The product of this pathway is fucosyltransferases which is then used in a different pathway that creates fucosylated glycans which is used for cell signaling and immunity in the body. Fucose is a deoxyhexose that is present in a wide variety of organisms. In most mammals, fucose-containing glycans have important roles in blood transfusion reactions, selectin-mediated leukocyte-endothelial adhesion, host-microbe interactions, and numerous ontogenic events. Along with those the body uses fucose as signaling branches of a cell and also as identification systems in immunity. However the enzyme only works at its top levels under normal body conditions. Increased pH or heat could severely denature the protein causing the enzyme to malfunction.

GDP-Mannose 4, 6-dehydratase Structure 
The enzyme contains four different subunits. Here is a link for a 3-D view of the enzyme  http://www.rcsb.org/pdb/explore/jmol.do?structureId=1RPN&bionumber=1

Structural studies

References

 
 
 
 
 
 

EC 4.2.1
NADH-dependent enzymes
Enzymes of known structure